Selby District is a local government district of North Yorkshire, England. The local authority, Selby District Council, is based in the town of Selby. The Local Authority had a population of 83,449 at the 2011 Census. The southernmost district of North Yorkshire, it borders the City of York unitary authority, the Borough of Harrogate in North Yorkshire, the City of Leeds and City of Wakefield districts in West Yorkshire, the City of Doncaster in South Yorkshire, and the ceremonial county of the East Riding of Yorkshire.

History

The district was formed on 1 April 1974 by the merger of Selby Urban District, Selby Rural District and parts of Derwent Rural District, Hemsworth Rural District, Osgoldcross Rural District and Tadcaster Rural District. Of them, Derwent Rural District was in the historic East Riding of Yorkshire, while the rest were in the West Riding of Yorkshire.

On 1 April 1996, the parishes of Acaster Malbis, Askham Bryan, Askham Richard, Bishopthorpe, Copmanthorpe, Deighton, Dunnington, Elvington, Fulford, Heslington, Kexby, Naburn and Wheldrake were all transferred from the district to form part of the new City of York Council unitary authority.  According to the 2001 census, those parishes had a population of 22,873.

Selby is twinned with Carentan in France and Filderstadt in Germany.

Towns and villages
Settlements in the district of Selby include:

Balne, Barlby, Barlow, Biggin, Bilbrough, Bolton Percy, Burn, Burton Salmon, Brayton, Brotherton
Camblesforth, Carlton, Cawood, Church Fenton, Cliffe, Chapel Haddlesey, Cridling Stubbs
Drax
Eggborough, Escrick
Fairburn
Gateforth
Hambleton, Hemingbrough, Hensall, Hillam, Hirst Courtney
Kelfield, Kellington, Kirk Smeaton
Long Drax, Lumby
Monk Fryston
Newthorpe, North Duffield
Osgodby
Riccall
Selby, Sherburn in Elmet, Skipwith, Stutton, South Milford, Stillingfleet
Tadcaster, Temple Hirst, Thorganby, Thorpe Willoughby, Towton
Ulleskelf
Walden Stubbs, West Haddlesey, Whitley, Wistow, Womersley

Council

The Conservative party currently have a majority on the council, with Labour in opposition. In July 2018, a senior Tory defected to the Yorkshire Party.

Abolition 
In July 2021 the Ministry of Housing, Communities and Local Government announced that in April 2023, the non-metropolitan county will be reorganised into a unitary authority.  Selby District Council will be abolished and its functions transferred to a new single authority for the non-metropolitan county of North Yorkshire.

See also
Selby and District DIAL

References

External links

Prescott rules out regional polls (BBC)
Everything you need to know about Selby North Yorkshire

 
Districts of England established in 1974
Leeds City Region
Non-metropolitan districts of North Yorkshire